Táborfalva is a village in Pest county, Hungary.

References

External links

Populated places in Pest County